The Evangelical-Augsburg Holy Trinity Church in Lublin – is the fourth largest community of the Evangelical-Augsburg Church in Poland within the Warsaw Diocese.

History
In 1650 the Lutherans had to move their community from Lublin to Piaski Wielkie (also known as "Lutheran Piaski" - Polish: Piaski Luteranskie). Officially, the "Holy Trinity" community was founded in 1784, thanks to the approval of King Stanisław August Poniatowski.

Activities
Church services are held in the heritage-protected church on Sundays at 10 o'clock. On every first Sunday of the month the church service includes Eucharist and absolution. Before and after the church service, you can buy Bibles, religious literature and evangelical periodicals. After the church service, the community is invited to tea and coffee in the vicarage opposite the church.

Besides the church services on Sundays, the community organises Bible classes which are open to non-community members. During these classes various biblical texts are discussed together with the pastor. Bible classes take place on Thursdays at 5 o'clock pm (except during school holidays).

External links
Official Homepage of the Evangelical-Augsburg Community in Lublin (mostly in Polish, partly in German)

TrinityChurch
Lublin TrinityChurch
Lublin TrinityChurch
1788 establishments in the Polish–Lithuanian Commonwealth